The Raspberry Jams: A Collection Of Demos, Songs, And Ideas On Guitar is the third album by Jason Becker, released on October 19, 1999.

Track listing
All songs written by Jason Becker except where noted:

See also
Cacophony

References

External links
Jason Becker official website

1999 compilation albums
Jason Becker albums
Shrapnel Records albums